Ceratophyllus fringillae is a species of flea in the family Ceratophyllidae. It was described by Francis Walker in 1856.

References 

Ceratophyllidae
Insects described in 1856